is a railway station in the city of Sakata, Yamagata, Japan, operated by East Japan Railway Company (JR East).

Lines
Services operate approximately hourly during the daytime.

Station layout
The station consists of two opposed side platforms serving two tracks. The two platforms are linked by a footbridge. The station is unattended.

Platforms

History
Mototate Station opened on 5 December 1919. The station became unmanned from October 1981. A new station building was completed in August 2006.

Surrounding area
 Mototate Post Office

See also
List of railway stations in Japan

References

External links

 JR East station information 
 Livedoor Transit information 

Railway stations in Yamagata Prefecture
Uetsu Main Line
Railway stations in Japan opened in 1919
Sakata, Yamagata